Amber Renae Gray (born April 2, 1981) is an American actress and singer. She is known for portraying Hélène Bezukhova in the 2016 Broadway musical Natasha, Pierre, & the Great Comet of 1812 and for originating the role of Persephone in the musical Hadestown, both off and on Broadway. For the latter 2019 role, she was nominated for the Tony Award for Best Featured Actress in a Musical, additionally earning the 2020 Grammy Award for Best Musical Theater Album.

Early life and education
Gray was born on April 2, 1981, in Fort Belvoir, Virginia. She is a military brat and spent her early childhood across Europe and the United States. She later settled in Wayland, Massachusetts, where she attended Wayland High School.

She attended Boston University where she received a BFA in acting and New York University where she received an MFA in acting.

Career 
In 2007, she began her screen career by appearing in an episode of Law & Order: Special Victims Unit, titled "Haystack", as a character named Raye. She also worked as a photographer on Canada's Top Model in 2009 on the episode "Bright Lights: No Pity". In 2012, Gray first became involved with Natasha, Pierre, & the Great Comet of 1812. Gray portrayed Countess Hélène Bezukhova in the musical's performances at the Off-Off-Broadway Ars Nova Theater. Gray continued with Great Comet when it moved to Kazino Meatpacking in 2013, Kazino Times Square in 2014, and when it opened on Broadway in late 2016. Gray was awarded a 2017 Theatre World Award for her performance as Hélène.

In 2014, Gray reprised her leading role as Zoe in An Octoroon at Soho Repertory Theatre An Octoroon utilized the plot of The Octoroon, an 1859 melodrama, but turned it into a contemporary new play that discusses America's slave history and both past and present racism. In an interview with The New York Times , Gray spoke of the part's difficulty due to many intense racial scenes/ Gray remained with the production when it went on to play at Theatre for a New Audience in 2015.

In 2016, Gray portrayed Persephone in New York Theatre Workshop's production of the new musical Hadestown, based on Anaïs Mitchell's album of the same name and the tragic myth of Orpheus and Eurydice. Gray was again directed by Rachel Chavkin, whom she collaborated with during Great Comet. Gray was praised by critics, who were impressed by her "vocal dexterity," "charisma," and "powerhouse voice". She reprised this role in the Edmonton Citadel Theatre, London National Theatre, and Broadway productions. For the Broadway production, she received a nomination for the Tony Award for Best Featured Actress in a Musical.

In 2021, Gray debuted her first leading role in the Amazon limited series The Underground Railroad as Gloria Valentine.

Personal life 
Gray married Galen Hamilton in 2011. They have two children.

Gray is biracial.

Theatre

Filmography

Awards and nominations

References 

1981 births
American musical theatre actresses
Grammy Award winners
Living people
Theatre World Award winners
Wayland High School alumni
American film actresses
21st-century American actresses
American television actresses